The Syrian club's history of playing in the AFC Cup.

Participations

Syrian clubs statistics

Al-Ittihad

Pld = Matches played; W = Matches won; D = Matches drawn; L = Matches lost; GF = Goals for; GA = Goals against; GD = Goal difference.

* Al-Ittihad score always listed first

Note 1: Due to the political crisis in Syria, the AFC requested Syrian clubs to play their home matches at neutral venues.

Al-Jaish

Pld = Matches played; W = Matches won; D = Matches drawn; L = Matches lost; GF = Goals for; GA = Goals against; GD = Goal difference.

* Al-Jaish score always listed first

Al-Karamah

Pld = Matches played; W = Matches won; D = Matches drawn; L = Matches lost; GF = Goals for; GA = Goals against; GD = Goal difference.

* Al-Karamah score always listed first

Al-Majd

Pld = Matches played; W = Matches won; D = Matches drawn; L = Matches lost; GF = Goals for; GA = Goals against; GD = Goal difference.

* Al-Majd score always listed first

Al-Shorta

Pld = Matches played; W = Matches won; D = Matches drawn; L = Matches lost; GF = Goals for; GA = Goals against; GD = Goal difference.

* Al-Shurta score always listed first

Note 1: Due to the political crisis in Syria, the AFC requested Syrian clubs to play their home matches at neutral venues.

Al-Wahda

Pld = Matches played; W = Matches won; D = Matches drawn; L = Matches lost; GF = Goals for; GA = Goals against; GD = Goal difference.

* Al-Wahda score always listed first

See also
 AFC Cup

External links
 AFC Cup on RSSSF

Football clubs in the AFC Cup